The 2018 ECAC Hockey Men's Ice Hockey Tournament was the 57th tournament in league history. It was played between March 2 and March 17, 2018. First Round and Quarterfinal games were played at home team campus sites, while the final four games were played at the Herb Brooks Arena in Lake Placid, New York. By winning the tournament Princeton received the ECAC's automatic bid to the 2018 NCAA Division I Men's Ice Hockey Tournament.

Format 
The tournament features four rounds of play. The teams that finish above fifth place in the standings receive a bye to the quarterfinal round. In the first round, the fifth and twelfth seeds, the sixth and eleventh seeds, the seventh and tenth seeds and the eighth and ninth seeds played a best-of-three series with the winners advancing to the quarterfinals. In the quarterfinals the one seed plays the lowest remaining seed, the second seed plays the second-lowest remaining seed, the third seed plays the third-lowest remaining seed and the fourth seed plays the fourth-lowest remaining seed another best-of-three series with the winners of these the series advancing to the Semifinals. In the semifinals the top remaining seed plays the lowest remaining seed while the two remaining teams play against each other. The winners of the semifinals play in the championship game, and no third-place game is played. All series after the quarterfinals are single-elimination games. The tournament champion receives an automatic bid to the 2018 NCAA Division I Men's Ice Hockey Tournament.

Conference standings 
Note: GP = Games played; W = Wins; L = Losses; T = Ties; PTS = Points; GF = Goals For; GA = Goals Against

Bracket 
Teams are reseeded after the First Round and Quarterfinals

Note: * denotes overtime period(s)

Results

First round

(5) Dartmouth vs. (12) St. Lawrence

(6) Colgate vs. (11) Rensselaer

(7) Princeton vs. (10) Brown

(8) Yale vs. (9) Quinnipiac

Quarterfinals

(1) Cornell vs. (9) Quinnipiac

(2) Union vs. (7) Princeton

(3) Clarkson vs. (6) Colgate

(4) Harvard vs. (5) Dartmouth

Semifinals

(1) Cornell vs. (7) Princeton

(3) Clarkson vs. (4) Harvard

Championship

(3) Clarkson vs. (7) Princeton

Tournament awards

All-Tournament Team
F Eric Robinson (Princeton)
F Max Becker (Princeton)
F Sheldon Rempal (Clarkson)
D Kelly Summers (Clarkson)
D Josh Teves (Princeton)
G Ryan Ferland* (Princeton)
* Most Outstanding Player(s)

References 

ECAC Hockey Men's Ice Hockey Tournament
Sports in Lake Placid, New York
College sports in New York (state)
ECAC Tournament
Ice hockey in New York (state)
ECAC Hockey Men's Ice Hockey